Sampson Tubb (11 October 1840 – 27 January 1891) was an English first-class cricketer. Tubb was a right-handed batsman who bowled right-arm fast roundarm.

Tubb made his first-class debut in 1864 for Hampshire against local rivals Sussex. The match was Hampshire's first match with first-class status. Tubb played in ten first-class matches for the club, the last of which came against Kent.

In his ten matches Tubb played as a bowler, taking 37 wickets at an average of 20.16. Tubb took two five wicket hauls, including 7–32 against Surrey in 1865.

Tubb died in Southsea, Hampshire on 27 January 1891. His name at death was registered as Samson Tubb.

External links
Sampson Tubb at Cricinfo
Sampson Tubb at CricketArchive
Matches and detailed statistics for Sampson Tubb

1840 births
1891 deaths
People from Southsea
English cricketers
Hampshire cricketers
People from Test Valley